Bursuq ibn Bursuq, also known as Bursuk ibn Bursuk (died in 1116 or 1117), was the emir (or lord) of Hamadan.

General 

He was the most notable son of Bursuq the Elder. Bursuq ibn Bursuq was a Turkic general in the service of the Seljuq Sultan Muhammad I Tapar. As emir of Hamadan, he participated in the military campaigns against the crusader states from the 1110s. The Artuqid ruler of Mardin Ilghazi defeated the supreme commander of the Sultan's army, Aqsunqur al-Bursuqi, in late 1114. Muhammad I soon replaced Aqsunqur with Bursuq, also charging him with the direction of the jihad (or holy war) against the crusaders (or Franks). After gathering new troops in Mosul and the Jazira, Bursuq invaded Syria in early 1115. After besieging Edessa for a short time, he marched towards Aleppo where he wanted to establish his base of operation. The eunuch atabeg of Aleppo, Lulu, sent envoys to Ilghazi, and the atabeg of Damascus, Toghtekin, seeking their assistance against Bursuq. Ilghazi and Toghtekin approached Roger of Salerno, who ruled the Principality of Antioch, and Roger soon called on the heads of the other crusader states, Baldwin I of Jerusalem, Pons of Tripoli and Baldwin II of Edessa. 

Roger defeated Bursuq in the Battle of Tell Danith on 14 September 1115. After Bursuq's defeat, the Seljuks of Mosul refrained from launching a new military expedition against the crusader states in Syria for ten years.

References

Sources 

 

 

Muslims of the Crusades
Turkic rulers
11th-century Turkic people
Bursuqid dynasty
Generals of the Seljuk Empire